PA12, PA-12 or PA 12 may refer to:

Pennsylvania's 12th congressional district
Pennsylvania Route 12
The old Pennsylvania Route 12, the Baltimore Pike
Piper PA-12 aircraft